Baptized in Bourbon is the seventh studio album by American country rap duo Moonshine Bandits from California. It was released on March 3, 2017 via Average Joes Entertainment. It features guest appearances from Bubba Sparxxx, Colt Ford, Crucifix, David Allan Coe, Demun Jones, Durwood Black, JellyRoll, Matt Borden, Outlaw, The Lacs and Uncle Kracker. The album peaked at number 111 on the Billboard 200 in the United States.

Track listing

Charts

References

2017 albums
Country rap albums
Moonshine Bandits albums
Average Joes Entertainment albums